England Lions may refer to:
 England national rugby league team
 England Lions (cricket team)

See also 
 English lion (disambiguation)